Sirisia Constituency is an electoral constituency in Kenya. It is one of nine constituencies in Bungoma County. The constituency was established for the 1988 elections.

Members of Parliament

Locations and wards

References

Constituencies in Bungoma County
Constituencies of Western Province (Kenya)
1988 establishments in Kenya
Constituencies established in 1988